Mahmoud Hammoud (1935 – 8 May 2018) was a Lebanese politician and diplomat.

Hammoud was a Shiite Muslim. He was born in Kafarkila, Marjayoun district, southern Lebanon.

He served as ambassador to the United Arab Emirates (1978–1983), West Germany (1983–1985), the Soviet Union and Finland (1986–1990), and the United Kingdom (1990–1999), where he was doyen of the diplomatic corps.

In October 2000, Hammoud became Foreign Minister for the first time. He served in that position until April 2003 when he became Defense Minister in a cabinet reshuffle. When the government of Omar Karami took office in October 2004, he was reappointed as foreign minister. Karami and his cabinet resigned in March 2005.

He died on 8 May 2018.

References

External links

1935 births
2018 deaths
Lebanese Shia Muslims
People from Marjeyoun District
Defense ministers of Lebanon
Ambassadors of Lebanon to West Germany
Ambassadors of Lebanon to the United Arab Emirates
Ambassadors of Lebanon to the Soviet Union
Ambassadors of Lebanon to Finland
Ambassadors of Lebanon to the United Kingdom
Foreign ministers of Lebanon
Independent politicians in Lebanon